The 1948 Grand National was the 102nd renewal of the Grand National horse race that took place at Aintree Racecourse near Liverpool, England, on 20 March 1948.

The race was won by the mare Sheila's Cottage at odds of 66/1. The winning jockey was Arthur Thompson and Neville Crump trained the winner. The pairing of Thompson and Crump won the Grand National again in 1952.

Sheila's Cottage became the first mare to win the National for 46 years, and only the 12th in the long history of the steeplechase.

First of the Dandies finished second, with Cromwell third and Happy Home fourth. Forty-three horses ran and all returned safely to the stables.

Finishing order

Non-finishers

References

 1948
Grand National
Grand National
20th century in Lancashire
Grand National